Railway stations in Tajikistan include:

The railroad system totals only 480 kilometers of track, all of it broad gauge. The system connects the main urban centers of western Tajikistan with points in neighboring Uzbekistan and Turkmenistan. In 2000 a new line connected the southern cities of Bokhtar and Kulob. Passenger transit through Tajikistan has been hindered by periodic failures of Tajik Railways to pay transit tariffs and by safety issues. Plans exist to link Tajikistan with Iran, Afghanistan, Kyrgyzstan and China with the Five Nations Railway Corridor.

Stations served 

There is no direct connection between the northern and southern networks.

North Network 
 Kokand (Uzbekistan)
 border UZ/TJ
 Konibodom
 Khujand (formerly Leninabad)
 border TJ/UZ
 Bekabad, Uzbekistan

South Network

Dushanbe - Iski-Guzar 

 Dushanbe 
 Vahdat (formerly Ordzhonikidzeabad)
 Iski-Guzar

Dushanbe - Denov 

 Dushanbe 
 Hisor
 Tursunzoda
 border TJ/UZ
 Denov, Uzbekistan

Dushanbe - Bokhtar - Kulob 

 Dushanbe 
 Obikiik
 Kuybyshevsk
 Bokhtar 
 Sarband (formerly Kalininabad)
 Kulob

Bokhtar - Termez 

 Bokhtar 
 Kolkhozobod 
 Shaartuz
 border TJ/UZ
 Termez, Uzbekistan

Bokhtar - Yovon 

 Bokhtar 
 Yovon

Proposed 

A railway link from Tajikistan through Afghanistan to Iran has been proposed, and construction of part of the new connection is underway.

 Dushanbe
 Vahdat
 Yovon
 Bokhtar
 Shaartuz
 Aivadj
 border TJ/AF Pyanj River 
 Mazar-i-Sharif

See also 

 Transport in Tajikistan
 Tajik Railway, operator of the rail network in Tajikistan https://www.railway.tj

References

External links

Railway stations
Railway stations
Tajikistan